Lahde or Lähde is the surname of the following people:
Andrew Lahde (born 1971), American financier
Gerhard Ludvig Lahde (1765–1833), Danish printmaker and publisher
Jari Lähde (born 1963), Finnish cyclist
Juho Lähde (born 1991), Finnish footballer
Matti Lähde (1911–1978), Finnish cross-country skier
Nestori Lähde (born 1989), Finnish ice hockey player